The Interim Independent Electoral Commission of Kenya (IIEC) was set up on May 7, 2009. The commission was set up to replace the previously disbanded Electoral Commission of Kenya that was widely blamed for the election violence after the Kenyan general election, 2007. The commissioners were sworn in on May 11, 2009.

Commissioners
 Ahmed Issack Hassan-  Chair
 Simiyu Abuid Wasike
 Winnie Guchu
 Yusuf Nzibo
 Davis Chirchir
 Douglas Mwashigadi
 Hamara Ibrahim Adan
 Ken Nyaundi
 Tiyah Galgalo

The Interim Independent Electoral Commission was later replaced by the Independent Electoral and Boundaries Commission (IEBC).

See also
 Constitution of Kenya
 Harmonized Draft Constitution of Kenya, 2009
Kriegler Commission
 10th Kenyan Parliament
 Interim Independent Boundaries Review Commission of Kenya

References

External links 
Interim Independent Electoral Commission

Politics of Kenya
Law of Kenya
Kenya